Benjamin "Benhur" de Castro Abalos Jr. (born July 19, 1962) is a Filipino lawyer and politician serving as Secretary of the Interior and Local Government since 2022. Before his appointment as DILG secretary, he last served as the Chairman of the Metropolitan Manila Development Authority (MMDA) under the Duterte administration from 2021 to 2022. Previously, he served as the city mayor of Mandaluyong, Metro Manila, for five terms, as congressman and as councilor of the same city. He is the son of Benjamin Abalos, a former Commission on Elections (COMELEC) and MMDA chairman. In January 2021, Abalos was appointed to the same position in the MMDA as his father following the death of Danilo Lim who died from complications of COVID-19.

Early life and education
Abalos is the second eldest of the five children of Benjamin Abalos and Corazon de Castro. He attended his elementary and secondary education at Don Bosco Technical College, where he completed the latter in 1979. He obtained his Bachelor of Arts degree in history and political science at De La Salle University in 1982. He then attended Ateneo de Manila University, where he completed Bachelor of Laws degree in 1987. As a law student at Ateneo, he was a representative to the Student Council during his first and fourth years. He was admitted to the bar in 1987.

Political career

City Councilor of Mandaluyong (1995—1998) 
Abalos first served as Councilor from the 1st district of Mandaluyong from 1995 to 1998. In that role, he chaired the Committee on Laws, Peace & Order and Public Safety and served on the Committee on Angara Affairs and Livelihood and Cooperatives.

Mayor of Mandaluyong (1998—2004) 
Abalos was first elected mayor in 1998, succeeding his father Benjamin Abalos. His brand of governance was credited for transforming Mandaluyong into the “Tiger City of the Philippines” in just one term of office. He was re-elected in 2001. He served as the local chief executive until 2004.

Congressman, Lone District of Mandaluyong (2004—2007) 
In the 2004 elections, he switched positions with a longtime political ally, Rep. Neptali Gonzales II, to become the city's lone representative to the House of Representatives of the Philippine Congress. Abalos served in this capacity until 2007. As a member of the lower house, he authored a total of 25 House bills and co-authored 54 others. He sponsored the biggest budget of the Philippine Sports Commission in its entire history. In addition, Abalos was the principal author of Republic Act No. 9397, otherwise known as the Amended Urban Development Housing Act of 1992.

Mayor of Mandaluyong (2007—2016) 
In 2007, Abalos was again elected mayor of Mandaluyong. He was re-elected in 2010 and in 2013.

In his second term as mayor, Abalos set new records after being elected as president of two national organizations. The first organization was the Union of Local Authorities of the Philippines (ULAP), an organization of all 1.2 million elected/appointed local officials in the country and their umbrella organizations (League of Governors, League of Vice Governors, Board Members, City Mayors, Municipal Mayors, Vice Mayors, Councillors, and Sangguinaang Kabataan, as well as nurses' and midwives' organizations). The second organization was the League of Cities of the Philippines (LCP), an organization of all 122 city mayors of the country. He was the first mayor to hold the presidency of these two prestigious organizations concurrently. His term in ULAP was also the first time a mayor had headed ULAP, which had traditionally been headed by a governor. He served as the local chief executive until 2016.

Chairman of the Metropolitan Manila Development Authority (2021—2022) 

Abalos was appointed by President Rodrigo Duterte as the chairman of the Metropolitan Manila Development Authority (MMDA) on January 11, 2021, replacing Danilo Lim, who died due to the coronavirus. Serving during the COVID-19 pandemic, he vowed to abide by the principle of good governance which he championed in Mandaluyong for more than a decade as its local chief executive. As head of the MMDA, Abalos led the agency in responding to the needs of Metro Manila pursuant to the mandates of the MMDA under Republic Act No. 7924. With this task at hand, Abalos enjoined all of the agency employees to continue working well in delivering efficient public service. Aside from being the MMDA Chairman, he is also the Chairman of the Regional Development Council for the National Capital Region and the presiding officer of the Metro Manila Council (the governing board and policy-making body of the MMDA).

Abalos resigned from the post on February 7, 2022, to serve as the national campaign manager of presidential aspirant Bongbong Marcos, one day before the start of the official campaign period for national candidates.

Secretary of the Department of Interior and Local Government 
On May 13, 2022, Atty. Victor Rodriguez, the spokesperson of presumptive president Bongbong Marcos, announced that Abalos has accepted Marcos's nomination to become the Secretary of the Interior and Local Government. The announcement came a few days after the 2022 presidential elections while Marcos had a commanding lead in the partial and unofficial tallies.

Abalos said he would bring his extensive political experience when he leads the Department of the Interior and Local Government (DILG) under the administration of Marcos. At this time when there is a strong call for our nation’s unity, Abalos said the "DILG will play a paramount role in promoting peace and order and in bringing together our local government units."

Personal life 
Abalos is married to Carmelita "Menchie" Aguilar, the incumbent vice-mayor of Mandaluyong, since 1985. He met her when she joined Binibining Pilipinas representing Cavite.

They have six children: identical twins Charisse and Ciara Marie, Benjamin III (Benjie), Charlene Marie, Maria Corazon (Corrine), and Celine Marie. Ciara Marie died in 2005 at age 19 due to an Escherichia coli bacterial infection.

Two of his children also entered politics; Charisse served as councilor from the 1st district of Mandaluyong from 2013 to 2022, while Benjamin III currently serves as councilor from the 2nd district since 2019. Maria Corazon is one of the delegates for Miss Universe Philippines 2021.

Health 
In July 2020, Abalos tested positive for COVID-19, after his father, Benjamin Sr., his mother, and his daughter Charisse tested positive for the disease prior to his diagnosis. He was able to recover from the disease.

Occupation 
 Lecturer, University of the Philippines - National College of Public Administration and Governance

Awards

Notes

References 

1962 births
Living people
Filipino educators
20th-century Filipino lawyers
21st-century Filipino politicians
Mayors of Mandaluyong
Members of the House of Representatives of the Philippines from Mandaluyong
Metro Manila city and municipal councilors
Ateneo de Manila University alumni
De La Salle University alumni
Chairpersons of the Metropolitan Manila Development Authority
Duterte administration personnel
Lakas–CMD (1991) politicians
PDP–Laban politicians
Campaign managers
Bongbong Marcos administration cabinet members